The Fred W. Hooper Stakes is a Grade III American Thoroughbred horse race for four years olds and older at the distance of one mile on the dirt held annually in January at Gulfstream Park, Hallandale Beach, Florida.  The event currently carries a purse of $150,000.

History
It was inaugurated on 7 January 1986 as the Tropical Park Handicap and was run at Calder Race Course on turf at a distance of "about"  miles.

In 1987 it was switched to dirt and set at a distance of  miles. The race was run twice in 1988, the first time at a distance of  miles in March, the second time in December at a distance of  miles. Creme Fraiche won both editions, the first in track record time. The race remained at a distance of  miles until 2015 when it was decreased to one mile.

The event was upgraded to Grade III in 1992.

In 1997, the race was renamed in honor of the prominent Thoroughbred owner/breeder, Fred W. Hooper who operated Circle H Farm, a horse breeding operation in Ocala, Florida. The race was not run in 2014, after which it was transferred to Gulfstream Park.

The event is run as part of the undercard for the Pegasus World Cup.

Records
Speed record: 
 1 mile – 1:33.53  Tommy Macho  (2016)  
  miles –  1:50.53 The Judge Sez Who 

Most wins:
 2 – Creme Fraiche (1988, 1988)
 2 –  Csaba  (2012, 2013)
 2 –  Tommy Macho  (2016, 2018)

Most wins by a jockey:
 5 –  Luis Saez  (2012, 2013, 2016, 2018, 2023)
 
Most wins by a trainer:
 3 – Nick Zito (2004, 2005, 2006)

Most wins by an owner:
 2 –  Brushwood Stable  (1988, 1988)
 2 –  Robert V. LaPenta  (2004, 2005)
 2 – Bruce Hollander & Cary Shapoff  (2012, 2013)
 2 –  	Paul P. Pompa Jr. (2016, 2018)

Winners

Legend:

 
 

Notes:

§ Ran as an entry

See also
List of American and Canadian Graded races

External links
 2021–22 Gulfstream Park Media Guide

References

Horse races in the United States
Graded stakes races in the United States
Open mile category horse races
Recurring events established in 1986
Gulfstream Park
Grade 3 stakes races in the United States
1986 establishments in Florida